MetroBus is the public bus service for Greater St. Louis connected with the MetroLink light rail system. It is managed by the Bi-State Development Agency and uses a shared fare system with the MetroLink system.

Service 
Its service currently has 75 bus routes and service four counties in Missouri and Illinois, including the City of St. Louis. MetroBus service operates daily and averages about 110,000 daily boardings, which is more than the MetroLink. The capacity of the system can accommodate 25,000 additional passengers during peak hours and the daily capacity of the system could most likely accommodate 115,000 additional boardings in all hours.

Bus routes

Missouri

Illinois

Facilities

Transit centers 
MetroBus connects with 11 transit centers in Missouri and 3 transit centers in Illinois, with 6 of the 11 connecting with MetroLink.
Shaw Transit Center
Clayton Transit Center
Central West End Transit Center
North Broadway Transit Center
Gravois Hampton Transit Center
Civic Center Transit Center
Brentwood Transit Center
Ballas Transit Center
Riverview Hall Transit Center
North Hanley Transit Center
Shrewsbury Transit Center
North County Transit Center

Bus loops 
Catalan Loop
Rock Hill Loop

Maintenance facilities 
There are four maintenance facilities in the Greater St. Louis Area.
Metro Main Shop
Brentwood Garage
DeBaliviere Garage
Illinois Garage

See also 
 MetroLink
 Bi-State Development Agency

References

External links 

Metro Website

 
Metro Transit (St. Louis)
Public transportation in St. Louis
Public transportation in St. Louis County, Missouri
Public transportation in St. Clair County, Illinois
St. Clair County Transit District
Public transportation in Greater St. Louis
Bus transportation in Missouri
Bus transportation in Illinois
St. Louis